Manuel Fernando da Silva Teixeira, known as Teixeirinha (born 26 January 1957) is a former Portuguese football player and coach.

He played 16 seasons and 249 games in the Primeira Liga for Marítimo, Vitória Guimarães, Vitória Setúbal, Beira-Mar, Porto, Académico de Viseu and Penafiel.

Club career
He made his Primeira Liga debut for Porto on 7 March 1976 in a game against Boavista.

Honours
Porto
Supertaça Cândido de Oliveira: 1983

References

External links
 

1957 births
Sportspeople from Vila Nova de Gaia
Living people
Portuguese footballers
Portugal youth international footballers
Portugal under-21 international footballers
FC Porto players
Primeira Liga players
Académico de Viseu F.C. players
S.C. Beira-Mar players
Vitória F.C. players
Vitória S.C. players
C.S. Marítimo players
F.C. Penafiel players
A.D. Ovarense players
Liga Portugal 2 players
Portuguese football managers
Association football defenders
Portugal B international footballers
CD Candal managers